John A. Miscovich (1918–2014) was an American inventor and gold miner. He and his family owned about 1400 acres of mining claims around Flat, Alaska and were active placer gold miners there. Miscovich was known as the "mayor of Flat".

He was the son of Peter Miscovich, known for inventing the steam washing machine and upgrading steam bath.

In 1990, Miscovich  received a Distinguished Service Award from the Alaska Miners Association. In 2012, Miscovich was inducted into the Alaska Mining Hall of Fame.

Inventions 
Miscovich's best known invention was the intelligiant, a water cannon used in fire-fighting and hydraulic gold mining.

He also filed a patent for a fire-fighting system for airport runways. The system is installed underground, and in case of fire it rises up and rotates both horizontally and vertically.

References

General references

External links
John Miscovich biographic profile with photos at Alaska Mining Hall of Fame.

1918 births
2014 deaths
American inventors